Tampa Bay Mutiny was a professional soccer team based in Tampa, Florida. They were a charter member of Major League Soccer (MLS) and played from 1996 to 2001. They played their home games at Tampa Stadium and then at Raymond James Stadium.

The Mutiny were established in 1994 and were owned and operated by MLS throughout their existence. They were successful in their first years of play, winning the first MLS Supporters' Shield behind MLS MVP Carlos Valderrama and high-scoring forward Roy Lassiter, whose 27 goals in 1996 remained the MLS single-season record until 2018. However, in subsequent years, dropping attendance and revenues became problems, especially as their on-field success declined and the lease at their second home pitch of Raymond James Stadium removed sources of gameday revenues. Owing to these issues, MLS attempted without success to find a local ownership group to take over operations from the league, and both the Mutiny and the league's other Florida-based team, the Miami Fusion, were folded before the 2002 season.

History
In 1994, newly established Major League Soccer announced it would place one of its charter franchises in the Tampa Bay Area. The region was seen as a potentially fertile market for soccer due to the success of the Tampa Bay Rowdies in the old North American Soccer League in the 1970s and 1980s. The Mutiny took the field in 1996 when the MLS began play. While the Mutiny had no direct connection to the Rowdies franchise, the Mutiny occasionally paid tribute to its predecessor by wearing green and gold alternative kits, once wearing both the Mutiny and Rowdies logos on the same shirt.

The Mutiny were owned and operated by MLS along with two other teams, the Dallas Burn and the San Jose Clash, with the league hoping eventually sell the franchises to private local owners. The team managed strong signings in 1995, including Carlos Valderrama, Roy Lassiter, and Martín Vásquez. They were successful in their first two years, particularly in 1996, when they won the first Supporters' Shield with the best regular-season finish behind Most Valuable Player Carlos Valderrama and Golden Boot winner Roy Lassiter.

On April 13, 1996, the Mutiny played their inaugural game against the New England Revolution, winning 3–2. Led by manager Thomas Rongen and Roy Lassiter, who scored a record 26 goals in the season, the Mutiny claimed the best record in the league at 20–12 and were the first winners of the Supporters' Shield. In the playoffs, they beat the Columbus Crew before losing in the conference final to eventual champions D.C. United.

In 1997, Thomas Rongen took over the New England Revolution, and was replaced by John Kowalski. Under him, the Mutiny finished the season with a record of 17–15, but were swept in the playoffs by the Columbus Crew. After the season, Kowalski resigned from the club. 1998 saw Tim Hankinson join the club as the new manager while star player Carlos Valderrama joined new MLS side Miami Fusion. As a result, the Mutiny would struggle through the season, finishing with a record of 12–20, missing the playoffs for the first time.

In 1999, the Mutiny reacquired Carlos Valderrama. Despite this, they struggled, being swept by the Columbus Crew in the first round of the playoffs, which they qualified for despite having a losing record. In the 2000 season, the Mutiny finished with a 16–12–4 record after rebounding from a poor start to the campaign. However, they were swept by the Los Angeles Galaxy in the first round of the playoffs. In 2001, Tim Hankinson was fired, but struggles continued with successors Alfonso Mondelo and Perry Van der Beck. Mondelo was fired midseason, and neither manager could revive the struggling franchise. On September 4, the Mutiny lost 2–1 to the Columbus Crew in what would be their last ever match. They managed just four wins and two draws, recording 21 losses over the course of the campaign. 

The city of Tampa demolished Tampa Stadium in 1998, and the Mutiny moved to new Raymond James Stadium for the 1999 season with a much less favorable lease. The club was hampered by declining attendance and low revenues which were exacerbated by a lease agreement that transferred most match day revenue to the Tampa Bay Buccaneers, resulting in an inability to secure a local ownership group. In 2001, the Mutiny had the worst record in MLS with only four wins in twenty-seven matches on the season and drew an average attendance of under 11,000 per game, among the league's lowest. Faced with financial losses up to $2 million a year, MLS courted Malcolm Glazer and his family, owners of the Tampa Bay Buccaneers National Football League team, to purchase the Mutiny. The Glazers considered the deal but ultimately declined, leaving the league with no prospective owners willing to take over the team. MLS folded the Mutiny, as well as its other Florida-based team, the Miami Fusion, in 2002. The Glazers would purchase Manchester United in 2005.

Honors

Team
MLS Supporters' Shield:
1996

Eastern Conference (Regular Season Winners):
1996

Copa de Puerto Rico
2000

Players

MLS Most Valuable Player:
1996 Carlos Valderrama

MLS Rookie of the Year Award: (2)
1996 Steve Ralston 
1997 Mike Duhaney

MLS Golden Boot: (2)
1996 Roy Lassiter (27g, 4a)
2000 Mamadou Diallo (26g, 4a)

MLS Fair Play Award: (2)
1999 Steve Ralston 
2000 Steve Ralston

MLS Best XI selections (7)
1996 Carlos Valderrama, Roy Lassiter 
1997 Carlos Valderrama 
1999 Steve Ralston 
2000 Carlos Valderrama, Steve Ralston, Mamadou Diallo

MLS All-Star Game MVP: (3)
1996 Carlos Valderrama 
1997 Carlos Valderrama 
2000 Mamadou Diallo

MLS All-Star Game starters: (10)
1996 Carlos Valderrama, Roy Lassiter, Martín Vásquez, Cle Kooiman 
1997 Carlos Valderrama 
1998 Frankie Hejduk, Jan Eriksson 
1999 Carlos Valderrama 
2000 Carlos Valderrama, Steve Ralston

MLS All-Star Game reserves: (10)
1996 Mark Dougherty, Steve Pittman 
1997 Giuseppe Galderisi, Steve Ralston, Frank Yallop 
1998 Thomas Ravelli, Mauricio Ramos 
2000 Mamadou Diallo, Scott Garlick 
2001 Mamadou Diallo

MLS records:
26 assists in one season: Carlos Valderrama in 2000
MLS All-Star Game MVP: Carlos Valderrama in 1996 & 1997

Canadian Soccer Hall of Fame:
2004 Frank Yallop

Coach and Admin
MLS Coach of the Year Award:
1996 Thomas Rongen

MLS Executive of the Year Award:
1999 Nick Sakiewicz

MLS Operations Executive of the Year Award: (2)
1996 Eddie Austin
2001 Eddie Austin

Players
 See also All-time Tampa Bay Mutiny roster

Head coaches
 Thomas Rongen (1996)
 John Kowalski (1997–98)
 Tim Hankinson (1998–00)
 Alfonso Mondelo (2001)
 Perry Van der Beck (2001)

Team records
Games:  Steve Ralston (177)
Goals:  Roy Lassiter (37)
Assists:  Carlos Valderrama (81)
Shutouts:  Scott Garlick (11)

Home stadiums
 Tampa Stadium (1996–1998)
 Raymond James Stadium (1999–2001)

Year-by-year

See also

Tampa Bay Rowdies of the USL Championship
Fort Lauderdale–Tampa Bay rivalry

References

External links
 Official website (archived December 2, 2001)
 Tampa Bay Mutiny on St. Petersburg Times
 BigSoccer.Com: Central Florida Superthread (Part 2)
 SportsEcyclopedia.Com: Tampa Bay Mutiny (1996–2001)

 
Defunct soccer clubs in Florida
Association football clubs established in 1994
Mutiny
Defunct Major League Soccer teams
Sports in Tampa, Florida
Association football clubs disestablished in 2002
1994 establishments in Florida
2002 disestablishments in Florida